Elmo Tiisvald (born 13 June 1967) is an Estonian conductor born in Tallinn. He started his music studies at the Tallinn Music High School in the violin class of Tiiu Peäske and continued his studies, violin with Lemmo Erendi and choral conducting with Enn Oja, at the Tallinn Georg Ots Music School.

He has been involved at the Estonian Boys Choir for many years as a choir singer and soloist. From 1977 to 1979 he sang the title role of Britten's The Little Sweep at the Estonian National Opera.

Tiisvald has graduated from the Estonian Academy of Music both as a choral conductor (class of Prof. Ants Üleoja) in 1993, and orchestra conductor (class of Prof. Paul Mägi and Prof. Roman Matsov) in 2003. Elmo Tiisvald has attended master courses with John Eliot Gardiner and Helmuth Rilling at the Stuttgart Bach Academy and participated in several masterclasses with Jorma Panula, Neeme Järvi and Sylvain Cambreling.

In 1992-1995, Tiisvald worked as a singer, chorus master and conductor of Estonian Philharmonic Chamber Choir and a lecturer at the Estonian Academy of Music. In 1995, Tiisvald started his work as the assistant conductor of the Symphony Orchestra of Estonian NO and a chief chorus master at the same opera company (1998 – 2009). During the period of 1991-2009, Tiisvald was the music supervisor of more than thirty oratorical works, about thirty five operas, four operettas and six musicals. Tiisvald has conducted operas, ballets and musicals at the Estonian NO and at numerous music festivals in Estonia, Russia and Germany. Tiisvald has worked with the Estonian National SO, Pärnu City Orchestra, Tallinn Baroque Orchestra, Estonian Philharmonic Chamber Choir, Mixed Choir of Estonian Radio, Estonian National Male Choir, Oratorio Choir and the Opera Choir of the Estonian National Opera.

At the present, Elmo Tiisvald is the chief chorus master of Estonian NO, the lecturer in the faculty of conducting and the artistic director and conductor of Opera Studio at Estonian Academy of Music and Theatre. 
In 2014, Elmo Tiisvald was nominated as candidate for the Conductor of the Year Music Award.

Recordings
 Enchanted operetta - Margit Saulep & Urmas Põldma - Pärnu City Orchestra CD - conductor
Olav Ehala: Arabella Birgitta Festival CD - conductor 
Voices of the Estonian National Opera, CD – chorusmaster
Erkki-Sven Tüür: opera Wallenberg, DVD – chorusmaster
Cyrillus Kreek: Requiem, CD – chorusmaster
The King Arthur's Opera Gala, DVD – chorusmaster
Tauno Pylkkänen: opera Mare and her Son, CD – chorusmaster
Rudolf Tobias: oratorio Jonah's Mission, 300 Years of St. Peterburg, DVD – chorusmaster
Olav Ehala: family musical Bumpy, DVD – conductor
A. S. Dargomõžski (ru): opera Mermaid, VHS – chorusmaster
Eino Tamberg: opera Cyrano de Bergeraque, CD, VHS – assistant conductor
Verdi: opera Nabucco, DVD, CD – chorusmaster
Rauno Remme: Voices, Cor mundum, CD – conductor
Purcell: opera Dido and Aeneas, CD – conductor

External links
Official website

1967 births
Musicians from Tallinn
Living people
Estonian conductors (music)
Estonian choral conductors
ECM Records artists
Tallinn Music High School alumni
Estonian Academy of Music and Theatre alumni
21st-century conductors (music)